Theophilus Buckworth, (b,d Wisbech)  a Fellow of Trinity College, Cambridge, was an Irish Anglican priest: he was Bishop of Dromore from 1613 until his death on 8 September 1652.

References

People from Wisbech
1652 deaths
Fellows of Trinity College, Cambridge
Anglican bishops of Meath
Anglican bishops of Dromore